Anoa, also known as dwarf buffalo and sapiutan, are two species of the genus Bubalus, placed within the subgenus Anoa and endemic to the island of Sulawesi in Indonesia: the mountain anoa (Bubalus quarlesi) and the lowland anoa (Bubalus depressicornis). Both live in undisturbed rainforest and are similar in appearance to miniature water buffaloes, weighing .

Both species of anoa have been classified as endangered since the 1960s and the populations continue to decrease.  Fewer than 5,000 animals of each species likely remain.  Reasons for their decline include hunting for hides, horns and meat by the local peoples and loss of habitat due to the advancement of settlement. Currently, hunting is the more serious factor in most areas.

Anoa are most closely allied to the larger Asian buffaloes, showing the same reversal of the direction of the hair on their backs. The horns are peculiar for their upright direction and comparative straightness, although they have the same triangular section as in other buffaloes. White spots are sometimes present below the eyes and there may be white markings on the legs and back; the absence or presence of these white markings may be indicative of distinct races. The horns of the cows are very small. The nearest allies of the anoa appear to be certain extinct Asian buffaloes, the remains of which have been found in the Siwalik Hills of northern India.

Both are found on the island of Sulawesi and the nearby island of Buton in Indonesia. They apparently live singly or in pairs, rather than in herds like most cattle, except when the cows are about to give birth. Little is known about their life history as well. However, in captive individuals they have a life expectancy of 20–30 years. The anoa take two to three years before they reach sexual maturity and have one calf a year and have very rarely been seen to have more.

Skulls of anoa cannot be accurately identified as to species, and there is likely hybridizing and interbreeding between the two in the zoo population. It is questioned as to whether the two species were actually different due to them occurring together in many different areas, as well as some interbreeding. A study of the mtDNA of ten specimens from different localities found a high mitochondrial genetic diversity between individuals identified as one or the other species, indicating support for recognition as two species.

Species

It is usually solitary, living in lowland forests, browsing on plants and understory. According to the Groves (1969) the lowland anoa can be told apart from the other species by being larger, having a triangular horn cross-section, sparse as opposed to thick and woolly hair, and always having white marking on the face and legs.

 The mountain anoa (Bubalus quarlesi) is also known as Quarle's anoa and anoa pegunungan. They also have longer, woolier hair that moults every year, showing faint spots on the head, neck and limbs. According to the Groves (1969) the mountain anoa can be told apart from the other species by being smaller, having a round horn cross-section, thick and woolly hair, and sometimes having white marking on the face and legs.

Distribution
Both the lowland anoa (Bubalus depressicornis) and the mountain anoa (Bubalus quarlesi) are endemic to the islands of Sulawesi in Indonesia. Both species appear to occur in exactly the same areas. Sulawesi is a unique area due to the fact that roughly 61% of the species found there are endemic species, including both anoa species.

Habitat
Traditionally, a key difference between the two species is the altitude at which they occur. The mountain anoa would be found at higher elevations than its lowland counterpart and is found in the forests. The lowland anoa was said to spend its time in the lower elevation areas and is also found in forests. Since 2005, however, these differences do not seem to be accurate, both species occur in the same areas in the same habitats.

Morphology
The anoa have many physical characteristics of bovine relatives and are considered to be most closely related to the water buffalo, which was confirmed through DNA analysis.

The physical characteristics of the two species are similar. The anoa is the smallest of the wild cattle species. When anoa are born, they have a set of thick, woolly fur that comes in many color variations ranging from yellow to brown. In adults, the fur is typically brown or black and males tend to have darker variations. Hair thickness varies slightly between the two species based on elevation and distribution. In both species of anoa, horns are present on both males and females and are typically straight protuberances. Another defining characteristic of the anoa is an extremely thick hide underneath the thick fur.

Conservation
Both anoa species are endemic to the island of Sulawesi and are currently experiencing large declines in their populations. Knowledge of their decline has only recently been documented, however, and the villages and villagers lack the knowledge of how to help maintain or increase populations.

The leading cause of their population decline is hunting by local villagers for meat, with habitat loss also being significant. One benefit of the lack of knowledge about the legal status of what they are doing is that villagers are open to communication with researchers on their harvests and hunting practices; where awareness of conservation issues has penetrated, villagers will lie about their activities.

Logging is a large issue due to the fact that both species prefer core forested habitat that is far away from humans and the influences that come with them. By logging, humans create much more fragmented habitat and, therefore, a decrease in the area where the anoa can breed and live. This habitat fragmentation also alters the natural mixing of populations of the anoa. This may lead to a loss in genetic diversity between the two species and, over time, could also lead to their decline.

References

External links

DIET COMPOSITION OF ANOA (Bubalus sp.) STUDIED USING DIRECT OBSERVATION AND DUNG ANALYSIS METHOD IN THEIR HABITAT from https://ejournal.undip.ac.id/index.php/jitaa/article/view/7608/6259

Pujaningsih, R.i., et al. “DIET COMPOSITION OF ANOA (Bubalus sp.) STUDIED USING DIRECT OBSERVATION AND DUNG ANALYSIS METHOD IN THEIR HABITAT.” Journal of the Indonesian Tropical Animal Agriculture, vol. 34, no. 3, 2009, doi:10.14710/jitaa.34.3.223-228.

 Lowland Anoa Bubalus depressicornis Smith from wildcattleconservation.org

Bovines
Mammals of Sulawesi
Endemic fauna of Indonesia